von Pfeil is a surname. Notable people with the surname include:

Enzio von Pfeil (born 1953), German economist
Joachim von Pfeil (1857–1924), German explorer and colonist
Count Jefferson von Pfeil und Klein-Ellguth (born 1967), German noble